Jill Pittard (born 5 September 1977) is a badminton player from England.

Career

All matches in the following incomplete list were in women's singles.
2009 Portugal International: winner
2009 Le Volant d'Or de Toulouse: finalist
2007 BWF World Championships: defeated in the first round by Kaori Mori, of Japan, 21–13, 21–16
2007 National Championships: finalist, defeated by Elizabeth Cann, 21–19, 21–17
2006 National Championships: finalist, defeated by Tracey Hallam, 8–11, 11–4, 11–0
Winner, 2006/07 European Badminton Circuit
2004 Austrian Open: defeated 16th-ranked Miho Tanaka of Japan in the quarter-finals
2004 Scottish Open: finalist
2003 Slovenian International: winner
1998 Iceland International: winner

Pittard has twelve caps for England.

References

External links
BWF player profile
Badminton England profile

Living people
1977 births
Sportspeople from Coventry
English female badminton players